Pool B of the 2010 Women's Rugby World Cup was composed of 2006 World Cup runners-up England, Ireland, United States and Kazakhstan.

Kazakhstan vs United States

Touch judges:
Kerstin Ljungdahl (Germany)
Barbara Guastini (Italy)
Fourth official:
Alan Biggs (England)
Fifth official:
Andrea Ttofa (England)

England vs Ireland

Touch judges:
Kerstin Ljungdahl (Germany)
Barbara Guastini (Italy)
Fourth official:
Alan Biggs (England)
Fifth official:
Andrea Ttofa (England)

Ireland vs United States

Touch judges:
Clare Daniels (England)
Barbara Guastini (Italy)
Fourth official:
Andrea Ttofa (England)
Fifth official:
Sarah Cox (England)

England vs Kazakhstan

Touch judges:
Sherry Trumbull (Canada)
Andrew McMenemy (Scotland)
Fourth official:
Ed Turnill (England)
Fifth official:
Jane Pizii (England)

Ireland vs Kazakhstan

Touch judges:
Gabriel Lee (Hong Kong)
Joyce Henry (Canada)
Fourth official:
Jane Pizii (England)
Fifth official:
Catherine Lewis (England)

England vs United States

Touch judges:
Gabriel Lee (Hong Kong)
Joyce Henry (Canada)
Fourth official:
Ed Turnill (England)
Fifth official:
Claire Hodnett (England)

Pool B
2010–11 in Irish rugby union
2010–11 in English rugby union
2010 in American rugby union
rugby union
rugby union
rugby union
rugby union